Paul William Burch is an American musician, composer, and record producer based near the Natchez Trace.

Discography
Pan-American Flash (1996)
Wire to Wire (1998)
Blue Notes (2000)
Last of my Kind (2001)
Fool for Love (2003)
East to West (2006)
Still Your Man (2009)
WPABallclub Record Club (2010) (Ltd. Ed. pressing)
Words of Love (2011)
Great Chicago Fire, with the Waco Brothers (2012)
Fevers (2013)
Meridian Rising (2016)
Trovatore (Ltd. Ed. Pressing) (2018)
Light Sensitive (2020)Origins of Departure (Ltd. Ed.) (2020)

References

External links
Paul Burch official website

American alternative country singers
American country singer-songwriters
Living people
People from Nashville, Tennessee
Bloodshot Records artists
Singer-songwriters from Tennessee
Country musicians from Tennessee
Year of birth missing (living people)
Merge Records artists